is a Near-Earth asteroid that was discovered on 4 August 2013 in Observatorio Astronómico de La Sagra, with an estimated diameter of about 50 meters. At 02.18 GMT, 4 August 2013, this asteroid flew at a minimum distance from the Earth (371.4 thousand kilometers), accounting for 0.96 average radius of the lunar orbit, but until 2180 it will not approach the Earth closer than 3.2 million miles.

See also
2013 EC
2013 FW13
2013 ET

References

External links 
 
 
 

Minor planet object articles (unnumbered)

20130804